UFO: Aftermath is a 2003 real-time tactics/turn-based strategy video game created by ALTAR Interactive. It is a homage to the X-COM game series, with roots in the unfinished game The Dreamland Chronicles: Freedom Ridge. It was followed by two sequels, UFO: Aftershock (2005) and UFO: Afterlight (2007).

The game's concept is similar to the unreleased X-COM: Genesis. The player assumes the role of commander of the last humans left on Earth and guides the forces through the crisis to eventually overcome the alien threat. UFO: Aftermath combines global strategy with tactical missions, including an RPG-style approach to each soldier's attributes and skills.

Gameplay

Rooted deeply in the X-COM series, the game combines elements of strategy with squad-based tactics. The game consists of two alternating phases: a strategy phase in which players control and expand their organizations, and a tactical phase in which player-controlled units battle alien enemies.

The strategic phase allows players to outfit their troopers for action, acquire new equipment and personnel, and conduct research to enable the production of more advanced equipment. Mission markers pop up on the globe, indicating locations where a team can be dispatched to battle. Players may expand their territory by winning battles, allowing more access to resources.

The tactical phase is real-time combat. All combatants move and act simultaneously, rather than using turns. Players can pause time or have the game set to automatically pause on certain events and issue orders to their troopers. In a deviation from the X-COM series, the battlefield is presented in fully rotatable 3D view.

Plot

In May 2004, a giant spacecraft approached Earth. Hovering over the planet, it released large clouds of spores into the upper atmosphere. Rapidly multiplying, the spores soon darkened the skies, obscuring the sun completely. This period is known as the "Twilight". Having reached critical mass in the skies, the spores began to rain down, clogging the streets and bodies of water, smothering people in their homes and burying animals in the wild. During the "Nightfall", as it would come to be called, most of the higher life forms on earth were wiped out. During the Twilight, all human responses were futile. The governments of the world chose caution over aggression, not realizing how quickly the end could come, and were buried. However, a few survivors sealed themselves in underground bases with stocks of food and oxygen. After several weeks, the spores seemed to disintegrate, decomposing and settling into the soil.

The player must gather together the remaining peoples of the planet, find out what has happened, and, if possible, take vengeance. The aliens the player fights are known as the Reticulans, who are heavily based on Greys, controlling various horrific mutant lifeforms.

Development and release

Originally, the game began as an abortive project titled The Dreamland Chronicles: Freedom Ridge by the American company Mythos Games, headed by the original creator of the X-COM series, Julian Gollop. Following the bankruptcy of Mythos, the unfinished game was bought from Virgin Interactive by the Czech company Altar Interactive in 2002. However, disappointed with the state of development, and finding themselves unable to simply complete it, Altar soon decided to restart it almost completely, retaining only some of the original project's core concepts and ideas but practically none of its actual assets, featuring a completely different combat system and a largely new story. Even the game's title changed, first to UFO: Freedom Ridge and finally to UFO: Aftermath.

Reception

UFO: Aftermath received middling reviews. GameSpot gave it 6.4 out of 10 for some simplified and missing features, previously seen in X-COM, that would have allowed for more in-depth gameplay. IGN gave it 7.5 (Good), criticizing simplicity and lack of some features from the X-COM series. GameSpy noted "Cons: Bad AI and pathfinding; repetitive missions; shallow strategic gameplay; persistent inventory bugs," but praised some parts of the game.

Legacy
Both official and third-party tools exist to help modding UFO: Aftermath. In order to encourage user mods, the publisher held an official contest, resulting in mods affecting many aspects of the game, including skins, weapon models, and characters. The tools are also compatible with the first sequel, UFO: Aftershock. The third sequel, UFO: Afterlight, will not accept modded content or added content because of changes in its engine.

References

External links

UFO: Aftermath entry at StrategyCore

2003 video games
Alien invasions in video games
Post-apocalyptic video games
Real-time tactics video games
Science fiction video games
Single-player video games
Video games about extraterrestrial life
Video games about zombies
Video games developed in the Czech Republic
Video games set in 2004
Windows games
Windows-only games
Tri Synergy games